This is a List of World Championships medalists in outdoor target archery. The World Archery Championships are one of the three pinnacle events organised by the World Archery Federation and the event with the longest continuous history, the others being the Olympic archery competition (1972–) and the World Cup (2006–).

Host cities

Champions

Recurve

''Note: 1. Unofficial; 2. Disputed

Compound

Recurve

Men's individual
Competition format:
1933–1955: International long and short rounds (various)
1957–1985: FITA round (90m, 70m, 50m, 30m)
1987–: Olympic round (set system from 2011)

Women's individual
Competition format:
1933–1955: International long and short rounds (various)
1957–1985: FITA round (70m, 60m, 50m, 30m)
1987–: Olympic round

Men's team
Competition format:
1933–1955: International long and short rounds (various), cumulative total of leading archers per country (1933–36 unofficial)
1957–1985: FITA round (90m, 70m, 50m, 30m), cumulative total of leading archers per country
1987–: Olympic round

Women's team
Competition format:
1933–1955: International long and short rounds (various), cumulative total of leading archers per country (1933–36 unofficial)
1957–1985: FITA round (90m, 70m, 50m, 30m), cumulative total of leading archers per country
1987–: Olympic round

Mixed team (2011–)
Competition format:
2011–: Olympic round

Mixed individual

Mixed team (1931–32)
The mixed team event was an unofficial event

Compound

Men's individual

Women's individual

Men's team

Women's team

Mixed team (2011–)

All-time medal table (1931–2021)

Including medals earned in the unofficial team events in 1931–1936

See also
List of Olympic medalists in archery
FITA Archery World Cup

References

 History of FITA 1931–1961 by Robert Rhode
 Archery Champions by Robert Rhode
 FITA World Championships home page
 FITA World Championships results

medalists
World Archery Championships
World